Catalan